("love song") was a tradition of lyric- and song-writing in Germany and Austria that flourished in the Middle High German period. This period of medieval German literature began in the 12th century and continued into the 14th. People who wrote and performed Minnesang were known as Minnesänger, and a single song was called a Minnelied.

The name derives from minne, the Middle High German word for love, as that was Minnesang's main subject.  The Minnesänger were similar to the Provençal troubadours and northern French trouvères in that they wrote love poetry in the tradition of courtly love in the High Middle Ages.

Social status
In the absence of reliable biographical information, there has been debate about the social status of the Minnesänger. Some clearly belonged to the higher nobility – the 14th century Codex Manesse includes songs by dukes, counts, kings, and the Emperor Henry VI. Some Minnesänger, as indicated by the title Meister (master), were clearly educated commoners, such as Meister Konrad von Würzburg. It is thought that many were ministeriales, that is, members of a class of lower nobility, vassals of the great lords. Broadly speaking, the Minnesänger were writing and performing for their own social class at court, and should be thought of as courtiers rather than professional hired musicians. Friedrich von Hausen, for example, was part of the entourage of Friedrich Barbarossa, and died on crusade. As a reward for his service, Walther von der Vogelweide was given a fief by the Emperor Frederick II.

Several of the best-known Minnesänger are also noted for their epic poetry, among them Heinrich von Veldeke, Wolfram von Eschenbach and Hartmann von Aue.

History
The earliest texts date from perhaps 1150, and the earliest named Minnesänger are Der von Kürenberg and Dietmar von Aist, clearly writing in a native German tradition in the third quarter of the 12th century. This is referred to as the Danubian tradition.

From around 1170, German lyric poets came under the influence of the Provençal troubadours and the French trouvères. This is most obvious in the adoption of the strophic form of the canzone, at its most basic a seven-line strophe with the rhyme scheme ab|ab|cxc, and a musical AAB structure, but capable of many variations.

A number of songs from this period match trouvère originals exactly in form, indicating that the German text could have been sung to an originally French tune, which is especially likely where there are significant commonalities of content. Such songs are termed contrafacta. For example, Friedrich von Hausen's "Ich denke underwilen" is regarded as a contrafactum of Guiot de Provins's "Ma joie premeraine".

By around 1190, the German poets began to break free of Franco-Provençal influence. This period is regarded as the period of Classical Minnesang with Albrecht von Johansdorf, Heinrich von Morungen, Reinmar von Hagenau developing new themes and forms, reaching its culmination in Walther von der Vogelweide, regarded both in the Middle Ages and in the present day as the greatest of the Minnesänger.

The later Minnesang, from around 1230, is marked by a partial turning away from the refined ethos of classical Minnesang and by increasingly elaborate formal developments. The most notable of these later Minnesänger, Neidhart von Reuental introduces characters from lower social classes and often aims for humorous effects.

Melodies

Only a small number of Minnelied melodies have survived to the present day, mainly in manuscripts dating from the 15th century or later, which may present the songs in a form other than the original one. Additionally, it is often rather difficult to interpret the musical notation used to write them down. Although the contour of the melody can usually be made out, the rhythm of the song is frequently hard to fathom.

There are a number of recordings of Minnesang using the original melodies, as well as Rock groups such as Ougenweide performing songs with modern instruments.

Later developments
In the 15th century, Minnesang developed into and gave way to the tradition of the Meistersänger. The two traditions are quite different, however; Minnesänger were mainly aristocrats, while Meistersänger usually were commoners.

At least two operas have been written about the Minnesang tradition: Richard Wagner's Tannhäuser and Richard Strauss' Guntram.

List of Minnesänger

Danubian lyric
Burggraf von Regensburg
Burggraf von Rietenburg
Dietmar von Aist (fl. 1143)
Der von Kürenberg (fl. 1143)
Leuthold von Seven (fl. 1147–1182)
Meinloh von Sevelingen
Engelhardt von Adelnburg

Early courtly lyric
Friedrich von Hausen
Henry VI, Holy Roman Emperor (d. 1197)
Heinrich von Veldeke (fl. 1173–1184)
Reinmar der Fiedler (fl. 1182–1217)
Spervogel

Classical Minnesang
Albrecht von Johansdorf
Bernger von Horheim
Gottfried von Strassburg
Hartmann von Aue (1160/1170–1210/1220)
Heinrich von Morungen
Reinmar von Hagenau (ca. 1210)
Walther von der Vogelweide
Wolfram von Eschenbach

Later Minnesang
Reinmar von Brennenberg
Regenbogen
Friedrich von Sonnenburg
Gottfried von Neifen
Heinrich von Meissen (Frauenlob) (1250/1260–1318)
Hugo von Montfort
Konrad von Würzburg (1220/1230–1287)
Neidhart (1st half of the 13th century)
Otto von Botenlauben (1177 – before 1245)
Reinmar von Zweter (1200 – after 1247)
Hawart
Süßkind von Trimberg
Der Tannhäuser
Ulrich von Liechtenstein (ca. 1200–1275)
Walther von Klingen (1240–1286)
Johannes Hadlaub (d. 1340)
Muskatblüt
Der von Wissenlo
Oswald von Wolkenstein

Example of a Minnelied
The following love poem, of unknown authorship, is found in a Latin codex of the 12th century from the Tegernsee Abbey.

Editions
The standard collections are

12th and early 13th Century (up to Reinmar von Hagenau):
H. Moser, H. Tervooren, Des Minnesangs Frühling.
Vol. I: Texts, 38th edn (Hirzel, 1988) 
Vol II: Editorial Principles, Melodies, Manuscripts, Notes, 36th edn (Hirzel, 1977) 
Vol III: Commentaries (Hirzel, 2000) 
Earlier edition: 
13th Century (after Walther von der Vogelweide:)
. (=KLD)
 (=SM)
14th and 15th centuries
Thomas Cramer, Die kleineren Liederdichter des 14. und 15. Jhs., 4 Vols (Fink 1979-1985)

There are many published selections with Modern German translation, such as
 (German translation)
 (With introduction, translation and commentary)
 (German translation and commentary.) 

Individual Minnesänger

The two Minnesänger with the largest repertoires, Walther and Neidhart, are not represented in the standard collections, but have editions devoted solely to their works, such as:
 

For these and some other major Minnesänger (e.g. Morungen, Reinmar, Oswald von Wolkenstein) there are editions with parallel Modern German translation.

Introductory works for an English-speaking readership
 (Selection of songs with English introduction and commentary.)
 (Selection of songs with English introduction and translation.)

See also
Frauenlied
Liederhandschrift

Sources
 Published in English as:

Further reading
  2 volumes.

External links

1857 edition of Karl Lachmann
 Adolph Ernst Kroeger The Minnesinger of Germany 1873
 
 
 

 
Musical terminology